Greg Rhymer (born 22 February 1972 in New York City) is an athlete who represented the British Virgin Islands.

Rhymer competed in the 800 metres and the 4 × 400 metres relay at the 1996 Summer Olympics in Atlanta, in the 800 metres he finished 7th in his heat and the team finished 6th in their heat of the relay, so he didn't qualify for the next round in either event.

References

Living people
1972 births
Track and field athletes from New York City
Eastern Michigan Eagles men's track and field athletes
Athletes (track and field) at the 1996 Summer Olympics
Olympic athletes of the British Virgin Islands
British Virgin Islands male sprinters
British Virgin Islands male middle-distance runners